OFC Belasitsa is a Bulgarian football club from the town of Petrich, currently playing in the Second League. The team was founded in 1923. They play at the Stadion Tsar Samuil in Petrich, which has a capacity of 9,500. The club last played in the first tier of Bulgarian football during the 2008-09 season.

History

Founding and early years
Belasitsa Petrich was founded in 1923 as FC Manush Voivoda. From 1957 the club was called DFS Belasitsa after the union of the local football clubs "Stroitel", "Cherveno zname", "Torpedo" and "Spartak", i.e. all the teams from Petrich.

First promotion to the top tier
In 1980, Belasitsa promoted to the A PFG for the first time ever. In its debut season in the Bulgarian elite in season 1980-81, the team finished in 13th place. In that same season, Belasitsa recorded its best appearance at the Bulgarian Cup, reaching the semifinals. They eliminated then holders of the cup, Slavia Sofia along the way. In the semifinal played on 22 April 1981, in Karlovo, Belasitsa lost to eventual winners Botev Plovdiv, by a score of 6-0. 

During these years, Belasitsa earned themselves a reputation for playing very strong football for a team not based in a major city. The team relied almost entirely on youth academy players for the first team. They played in the Bulgarian elite up until season 1983-84, when they were relegated after playoffs, ending a four-year stint in the A Group.

Second promotion and golden era

Belasitsa returned to the A Group in 1999, ending a 15-year absence from the top tier of Bulgarian football. However, the team largely struggled and was eventually relegated back after just one season in the top level. In 2001, 2 years after their relegation from the top flight, Belasitsa returned to the top level through administrative decisions made by its owners. That year Belasitsa united with Hebar, who finished 9th in the 2000-01 season, which resulted in Belasitsa taking Hebar’s place in the A Group, thus entering the elite once again. The team however, finished 13th during the 2001-02 season and was relegated back to the B Group. 

A year later, Belasitsa returned to the top level, and began its best ever campaign in the Bulgarian elite, managing to stay 6 consecutive seasons, up until 2009. One of the reasons for such strong results during these years was the fact that the team had brought a lot of talented Brazilian players, including Marcelo Vava, Dianu, Marquinos, and Eduardo Du Bala. In 2005, the team hired Macedonian coach Stevica Kuzmanovski, under whose guidance Belasitsa achieved its best ever result in the Bulgarian league, finishing in 6th place. Next season 2006-07, Belasitsa also performed strongly, finishing in 8th place. 

However, after that season, a general decline started, as the team finished in 13th place during the  2007-08 season, saving themselves from relegation in the last round. Unfortunately for Belasitsa, they finished last during the 2008-09 season, thus being relegated.

Financial problems and relegations to lower leagues
After they were relegated to the B Group in 2009, it was discovered that the team was in serious financial and administrative irregularities, and their future was very unclear. Belasitsa could not register enough players for the 2009–10 B Group, so they were disqualified before the season started. They were administratively relegated to the V AFG for that season. In 2012, further economic problems began and the team was in danger from ceasing its operations. However, the team is eventually saved, with the financial support coming from the Municipality of Petrich. Belasitsa was further relegated to the fourth tier of Bulgarian football, the regional amateur league for the 2012-13 season. They achieved first place and were promoted back to the V AFG. 

In the next few seasons, the club managed to rebuild their first team and returned to their original stadium, after it had license issues. In seasons 2020/21 and 2021/22, the team had largely fought for promotion to the Second League, but Belasitsa narrowly missed the first spot by a few points on both occasions.

Belasitsa had a very strong 2021-22 season, finishing in first place in the Southwest Third League and clinching promotion to the Second League after several seasons in the lower leagues.

Honours
Bulgarian First League:
6th place 2005–06

Bulgarian Cup:
Semi-finals (1): 1981

Previous names
1923 FC Manush Voivoda
1928 FC Lubomir Vesov
1931 FC Macedonia
1946 FC Ilinden
1948 FC Spartak

League positions

Current squad

For recent transfers, see Transfers summer 2022.

Statistics

Most league appearances for Belasitsa Petrich in A PFG
1.  Dimitar Karadaliev – 108
2.  Lozan Trenchev – 105
3.  Yordan Popov – 101
4.  Valeri Stoyanov – 93
5.  Aleksandar Vukov – 86

Season record goals for Belasitsa Petrich
1.  Kostadin Kabranov – 22
2.  Dimitar Karadaliev – 19
3.  Vavá – 18
4.  Georgi Bibishkov – 16
4.  Dimitar Dimitrov – 16
5.  Gabrijel Radojičić – 13
5.  Ivan Yanev – 13

Notable managers

References

Association football clubs established in 1923
Belasitsa
 
1923 establishments in Bulgaria